Octans is a faint constellation located in the deep Southern Sky. Its name is Latin for the eighth part of a circle, but it is named after the octant, a navigational instrument. Devised by French astronomer Nicolas Louis de Lacaille in 1752, Octans remains one of the 88 modern constellations. The southern celestial pole is located within the boundaries of Octans.

History and mythology
Octans was one of 14 constellations created by French astronomer Nicolas Louis de Lacaille during his expedition to the Cape of Good Hope, and was originally named l’Octans de Reflexion (“the reflecting octant”) in 1752, after he had observed and catalogued almost 10,000 southern stars during a two-year stay at the Cape of Good Hope. He devised fourteen new constellations in uncharted regions of the Southern Celestial Hemisphere not visible from Europe. All but one honoured instruments that symbolised the Age of Enlightenment.

It was part of his catalogue of the southern sky, the Coelum Australe Stelliferum, which was published posthumously in 1763. In Europe, it became more widely known as Octans Hadleianus, in honor of English mathematician John Hadley, who invented the octant in 1730. There is no real mythology related to Octans, partially due to its faintness and relative recentness, but mostly because of its extreme southerly latitude.

Notable features

Stars 

Octans is a very faint constellation; its brightest member is Nu Octantis, a spectral class K1 III giant star with an apparent magnitude 3.73. It is 63.3 ± 0.8 light-years distant from Earth.

Beta Octantis is the second brightest star in the constellation.

Sigma Octantis, the southern pole star, is a magnitude 5.4 star just over 1 degree away from the true south celestial pole. Its relative faintness means that it is not practical for navigation. Conveniently for navigators, there are other, much easier methods for locating the southern celestial pole.

For example, the constellation Crux, the Southern Cross, currently points toward the south celestial pole, if one draws a line from Gamma Crucis to Alpha Crucis. Another method includes an asterism made up of Sigma, Chi, Tau, and Upsilon Octantis, which form a distinctive trapezoid shape.

BQ Octantis is a fainter, magnitude 6.82 star located much closer to the South Pole (at less than a degree) than Sigma.

In addition to having the current southern pole star of Earth, Octans also contains the southern pole star of the planet Saturn, which is the magnitude 4.3 Delta Octantis.

The Astronomical Society of Southern Africa in 2003 reported that observations of the Mira variable stars R and T Octantis were urgently needed.

Three star systems are known to have planets. Mu2 Octantis is a binary star system, the brighter component of which has a planet. HD 142022 is a binary system, a component of which is a sunlike star with a massive planet with an orbital period of 1928 ± 46 days. HD 212301 is a yellow-white main sequence star with a hot jupiter that completes an orbit every 2.2 days.

Deep sky objects

NGC 2573 (also known as Polarissima Australis) is a faint barred spiral galaxy that happens to be the closest NGC object to the south celestial pole. NGC 7095 and NGC 7098 are two barred spiral galaxies that are 115 million and 95 million light-years distant from Earth respectively. The sparse open cluster Collinder 411 is also located in the constellation.

Namesakes
 was a stores ship used by the United States Navy during World War II.

See also
 Octans (Chinese astronomy)

Notes

References
Citations

References

External links 
 The Deep Photographic Guide to the Constellations: Octans
 The clickable Octans
 Starry Night Photography : Octans
 Star Tales – Octans

 
Southern constellations
Constellations listed by Lacaille